Sveta Gora is a settlement in western Slovenia in the Municipality of Nova Gorica. It encompasses Holy Mount, above the Soča Valley and southwest of the Banjšice Plateau.

History

In 1539 Uršula Ferligoj, a shepherd from Grgar, had a vision in which the Virgin Mary commanded her to tell the people to build her a church.

In May 1917 Sveta Gora was the scene of heavy fighting between Austrian and Italian forces. Several Austro-Hungarian bunkers are found along Skalnica Road (Skalniška cesta) leading to the Franciscan monastery and church at the top of Mount Skalnica. Sveta Gora became an independent settlement in 2006, when its territory was administratively separated from the territory of Solkan and Grgar.

References

External links
Sveta Gora on Geopedia

Populated places in the City Municipality of Nova Gorica
2006 establishments in Slovenia